The L4-L7 gas fields are significant natural gas producing fields in the Netherlands sectors L4 and L7 of the North Sea. They are operationally one complex which started producing gas from the L7 main platform hub in 1977 and was still partly operational in 2021.

The fields 
The adjacent Block L4 and L7 gas fields are located in the Southern North Sea. The L7 gas field was discovered in 1973 and the L4 field the following year. The L7 field had recoverable reserves of 1.47 trillion cubic feet.

Development 
The L4-L7 reservoirs were developed by a number of offshore installations across both Blocks. The L7 main platform complex was the hub of the fields, it received gas from its bridge-linked drilling/wellhead (C) and compression (PK) platforms, from L7 Block satellite platforms, and from the adjacent Block L4.

The peak production from the L7 field was 135 MMSCFD in 1978–9, and from the L4 field was 106 MMSCFD in 1983. The design capacity of the process facilities on L7-P platform is 5.5 million m3/day.

The field was initially operated by Petroland BV, then Total.

Decommissioning 
The status of the production facilities is given in the final column of the above table. The entire L7 field is now closed as is the L4-B Platform. Operations continue in parts of the L4 field.

See also 

 Helder, Helm and Hoorn oil fields
 Kotter and Logger oil and gas fields
K13 gas fields
K14-K18 gas fields
 L10 gas field

References 

North Sea energy
North Sea
Natural gas fields in the Netherlands